Ann Pearson is the Murray and Martha Ross Professor of Environmental Sciences at Harvard University and current chair of the Department of Earth and Planetary Sciences. Her research in the area of organic geochemistry is focused on applications of analytical chemistry, isotope geochemistry, and molecular biology to biochemical oceanography and Earth history.

Education 
After growing up on the San Juan Islands, Pearson completed her undergraduate degree in chemistry from Oberlin College, Oberlin, Ohio in 1992. She was a Peace Corps volunteer in Ecuador from 1993 to 1994. She earned her Ph.D. in Chemical Oceanography from the MIT/WHOI Joint Program in Oceanography with a dissertation titled "Biogeochemical applications of compound-specific radiocarbon analysis" for which she received MIT's Rossby Award.

Career and research 
Pearson has been on the Harvard faculty since 2001. She was the first woman in the Earth and Planetary Sciences Department to be awarded tenure.

Pearson's recent work has focused on the global carbon and nitrogen cycles, paleo-temperatures, and paleo- records. In 2010, Pearson described her research as "...the 'you are what you eat' philosophy for microbes" which allows her to use microorganisms to assess modern and ancient ecosystems. Notable research topics include investigations into chemoautotrophic processes using compound specific 14C-based methods, genomic evidence of sterol biosynthesis retained by Planctomycetota, and examinations of modern environments to reveal insights into environmental conditions in the past. In 2018, Pearson's research showed that increases in the size of eukaryotic phytoplankton increased the amount of carbon sequestered from the atmosphere.

Awards and honors 

 Fellow, Packard Foundation (2004) 
Radcliffe Institute Fellow (2009-2010)
Gordon and Betty Moore Foundation Investigator (20132019)
Paul W. Gast lecture, Geochemical Society (2015)
Benjamin Meaker Visiting Professor, University of Bristol (2018)
Fellow, American Geophysical Union (2019)
 John Hayes Award, Geochemical Society (2019)
 Joanne Simpson Medal, American Geophysical Union (2019)

References

External links 
Ann Pearson publications indexed by Google Scholar

American geochemists
Fellows of the American Geophysical Union
Oberlin College alumni
Massachusetts Institute of Technology alumni
Harvard University faculty
Living people
1971 births
Women geochemists